Warmness on the Soul is the first EP by American heavy metal band Avenged Sevenfold. It was released on April 10, 2001, through Good Life Recordings. The release features the video for the title track "Warmness on the Soul" as an enhanced CD bonus. It is the band's first release to feature guitarist Synyster Gates, who joined the band in February 2001. All of the songs were later included on Avenged Sevenfold's debut album, Sounding the Seventh Trumpet, except for the heavy metal version of "To End the Rapture", which was featured on the album's re-release.

Some of the band members' stage names are slightly different compared to their current ones. M. Shadows is simply credited as "Shadows", while Synyster Gates is credited as "Synyster Gaytes".

Meaning
Warmness on the Soul" is about M. Shadows' girlfriend (now wife), Valary. In an interview, Shadows said about the sound, "(We) wanted something really soft to break up the album. A lot of older metal bands did this and we liked the idea, so we just said fuck it and went with it."

Music video
The music video consists of scenes of the band performing, playing near the beach with Zacky Vengeance on lead guitar. The video centers around a woman (M. Shadows' wife) who is looking for the band members, who are wandering through city streets as she searches for them. Then the band walks onto a stage and performs the rest of the song.

Reception
The song was ranked at number 20 on Louder Sound's ranking of the best Avenged Sevenfold songs, and number 18 on Kerrang's.

Track listing
All songs credited to Avenged Sevenfold. Actual songwriters are listed below.

* This version was featured on the re-release of Sounding the Seventh Trumpet, replacing the original.

Personnel
Avenged Sevenfold
 Shadows — vocals, acoustic guitar
 Zacky Vengeance — lead guitar
 Synyster Gaytes — lead guitar on "To End the Rapture"
 Justin Sane — bass
 The Rev — drums, piano

References 

Avenged Sevenfold albums
2001 debut EPs
Good Life Recordings EPs